Egil Robert Ørskov, OBE FRSE is a Danish born Scottish agricultural scientist and development scholar. He is particularly known for research on the nutrition of farm animals.

Selected publications
 Ørskov, E.R. and McDonald, I., 1979. The estimation of protein degradability in the rumen from incubation measurements weighted according to rate of passage. The Journal of Agricultural Science, 92(2), pp. 499–503.
 Mehrez, A.Z., Ørskov, E.R. and McDonald, I., 1977. Rates of rumen fermentation in relation to ammonia concentration. British Journal of Nutrition, 38(3), pp. 437–443.
 Orskov, E.R., 1982. Protein nutrition in ruminants. Academic Press Inc.(London) Ltd.

Alma Mater
 Copenhagen University, University of Reading.

Career
 Rowett Research Institute, Macaulay Land Research Institute and the James Hutton Institute.

Awards
 OBE 1988 
 Royal Society of Edinburgh 1991

References

1934 births
Danish agronomists
Living people